Operation Argus was a series of United States low-yield, high-altitude nuclear weapons tests and missile tests secretly conducted from 27 August to 9 September 1958 over the South Atlantic Ocean. The tests were performed by the Defense Nuclear Agency.

The tests were to study the Christofilos effect, which suggested it was possible to defend against Soviet nuclear missiles by exploding a small number of nuclear bombs high over the South Pacific. This would create a disk of electrons over the United States that would fry the electronics on the Soviet warheads as they descended. It was also possible to use the effect to blind Soviet radars, meaning that any Soviet missile-based ABM system would be unable to attack the US counterstrike.

The tests demonstrated that the effect did indeed occur, but also revealed that it dissipated too rapidly to be very effective. Papers on the topic were published the next year, focusing on the events as purely scientific endeavors.

Objectives

The tests were proposed by Nicholas Christofilos in an unpublished paper of what was then the Livermore branch of the Lawrence Radiation Laboratory (now Lawrence Livermore National Laboratory) as a means to verify the Christofilos effect, which argued that high-altitude nuclear detonations would create a radiation belt in the extreme upper regions of the Earth's atmosphere. Such belts would be similar in effect to the Van Allen radiation belts. "Such radiation belts were viewed as having possible tactical use in war, including degradation of radio and radar transmissions, damage or destruction of the arming and fuzing mechanisms of ICBM warheads, and endangering the crews of orbiting space vehicles that might enter the belt." Prior to Argus, Hardtack Teak had shown disruption of radio communications from a nuclear blast, though this was not due to the creation of radiation belts.

Argus was implemented rapidly after inception due to forthcoming bans on atmospheric and exoatmospheric testing in October 1958. Consequently, the tests were conducted within a mere half-year of conception (whereas "normal" testing took one to two years). Because nuclear testing during this time was bending the rules, the military borrowed International Geophysical Year equipment to cover up the nuclear tests.

 Two missiles, with warheads 136–227 kg to be launched within one month of each other, originating from a single site.
 The missiles were to be detonated at altitudes of 200–1,000 mi, and also at 2,000–4,000 miles. Both detonations should occur near the geomagnetic equator.
These satellites were to be used to measure electron density over time, and include a magnetometer, as well as a means for measuring ambient radio noise. Measurements were to be taken before the shots to determine a baseline, as well as during and after the events.
 Sounding rockets, fired from appropriate ground locations, were to carry the same instrumentation as the satellites, except for radio noise. Ground stations to be used to study effects on radio astronomy and radar probing as well as auroral measurements.

Originally Argus was designated Hardtack-Argus, and later Floral. For reasons of security, both names were dropped in favor of the independent name Argus.

Funding was provided by the Armed Forces Special Weapons Project (AFSWP), the predecessor of today's Defense Threat Reduction Agency (DTRA). Total funds allotted for the project were US$9,023,000.

Task Force 88

The United States Navy Task Force 88 (or TF-88), was formed 28 April 1958. TF-88 was organized solely to conduct Operation Argus. Once Argus was completed, the task force was dissolved, and its records dispersed. Some of these records have been destroyed or lost in the intervening time period. Of particular note among the missing documents were the film records (which recorded radiation levels during the Argus tests). This has proved contentious due to the higher-than-normal number of leukemia claims among TF-88 participants to the Veterans Administration. Because of this, it has been difficult to resolve just how much radiation participants were exposed to.

USS Norton Sound was a United States Navy-guided missile ship responsible for missile-launching functions. She also served as a training facility for crews involved in the testing. The X-17A missiles to be used in the test were unfamiliar to those conducting the tests. Exercises including assembly and repair of dummy missiles were conducted aboard Norton Sound. She also carried a 27-MHz COZI radar, which was operated by Air Force Cambridge Research Center, which was used to monitor effects of the shots. She was responsible for the launching of three low-yield nuclear warheads into the high atmosphere. Her commanding officer, Captain Arthur R. Gralla, commanded Task Force 88. Gralla would later receive the Legion of Merit for his role conducting the tests expeditiously.

USS Albemarle, fresh out of an overhaul, was not listed on the TF-88 order. She set out to the Atlantic, supposedly on shakedown. She, too, mounted a COZI radar and other instrumentation for detecting man-made ionization. This instrumentation included IGY radiometers, receivers, radar, and optical equipment. After this equipment was added, she sailed to the ocean around the area of the Azores to record data at the conjugate point, as the rest of task force 88 headed to the South Atlantic to conduct the tests.

USS Tarawa served as overall command of the operation, with her commander serving as Task Group Commander. She carried an Air Force MSQ-1A radar and communication system for missile tracking. She also housed VS-32 aircraft for search and security operations as well as scientific measurement, photographic, and observer missions for each shot. HS-5 was also aboard and provided intra-task-force transportation for personnel and cargo.

USS Warrington, in conjunction with Bearss, Hammerberg, and Courtney maintained a weather picket 463 km west of the task force, provided a plane guard for Tarawa during flight operations, and carried out standard destroyer functions (such as surface security and search and rescue). Warrington also carried equipment for launching Loki Dart rockets.

USS Neosho refueled task force ships during the operation. She was also outfitted with Air Force MSQ-1A radar. Her commanding officer also served as the flagship for TG 88.3, the Mobile Logistics Group, consisted of: Neosho, equipped with USAF MSQ-1 radar and communication vans, USS Salamonie (AO-26), and assigned destroyers.

USS Salamonie returned to the United States upon arrival at TF-88, and did not participate in any shots.

Satellite tracking
Two satellite launches were attempted in order to obtain data from these high-altitude tests.  Explorer 4 was successfully launched on 26 July. Explorer 4 Successfully rode an Army Jupiter-C missile to orbit from Cape Canaveral. The satellite contained enough battery power to function for sixty days. This was long enough for the satellite to track and measure ARGUS.  Explorer 5 suffered a launch failure on 24 August.

There were many tracking systems used by the task force along with these satellites along with many organizations that helped track these missiles.  "These included the Naval Research Laboratory, the Army Signal Research and Development Laboratory, the Smithsonian Astrophysical Laboratory, the Army Map Service, the Naval Ordnance Test Station, and the Ballistic Research Laboratory along with ground tracking stations from the Aleutian Islands through the Azores from academic, industrial, and military organizations."

Preparation
To prepare for the launch of the ARGUS missiles, many tests and preparations were conducted. As the east coast units of TF 88 were heading towards the South Atlantic, they participated in countdown, launch, and missile- tracking drills using Loki/Dart high-altitude, antiaircraft rockets fired from the USS Warrington. Fourteen of these Loki launches were conducted from 12 to 22 August. These tests were conducted to test equipment and procedures, and to train personnel in specialized assignments. Some of these assignments necessary for the ARGUS missile launchings  were "stationing of ships, MSQ-1A radar tracking by the USS Neosho and the USS Tarawa, communications, positioning of sky-camera S2F aircraft, and area surveillance S2F aircraft."

Tests

About 1800 km southwest of Cape Town, South Africa, USS Norton Sound launched three modified X-17A missiles armed with 1.7 kt W-25 nuclear warheads into the upper atmosphere, where high altitude nuclear explosions took place. Due to the South Atlantic Anomaly, the Van Allen radiation belt is closer to the Earth's surface at that location. The (extreme) altitude of the tests was chosen so as to prevent personnel involved in the test from being exposed to any ionizing radiation. Even with the very low threat of radiation exposure, precautions were taken to prevent radiological exposure. The task force commander and his staff had laid out a series of precautionary radiation safe measures to be followed in each stage of the operation. Even though the chance of exposure to radiation from these missiles was so minute, the safety measures were still carried out as directed by the commander by the crew of Task Force 88.

Coordinated measurement programs involving satellite, rocket, aircraft, and surface stations were employed by the services as well as other government agencies and various contractors worldwide.

The Argus explosions created artificial electron belts resulting from the β-decay of fission fragments. These lasted for several weeks. Such radiation belts affect radio and radar transmissions, damage or destroy arming and fusing mechanisms of intercontinental ballistic missile warheads, and endanger crews of orbiting space vehicles. It was found after running these tests that the explosions did in fact degrade the reception and transmission of radar signals, another proof that Christofilos was correct about the Christofilos effect.

Argus proved the validity of Christofilos' theory: the establishment of an electron shell derived from neutron and β-decay of fission products and ionization of device materials in the upper atmosphere was demonstrated. It not only provided data on military considerations, but produced a "great mass" of geophysical data.

The tests were first reported by Hanson Baldwin and Walter Sullivan of The New York Times on 19 March 1959, headlining it as the "greatest scientific experiment ever conducted". This was an unauthorized publication that caused an uproar in the scientific community because many of them were unaware of the presence of artificial particles in the Earth's atmosphere. Approximately nine ships and 4,500 people participated in the operation. After the completion of testing, the task force returned to the United States via Rio de Janeiro, Brazil.

The tests were announced the following year, but the full results and documentation of the tests were not declassified until 30 April 1982.

List of Argus launches

List of ships involved in Operation Argus

See also
 Operation Dominic I and II
 HAARP
 List of artificial radiation belts

References

Further reading
Chun, Lt. Col. Clayton K. S. Shooting down a "Star": Program 437, the US Nuclear ASAT System and Present-Day Copycat Killers. College of Aerospace Doctrine Research and Education. April 2000, Maxwell Air Force Base, Alabama.

External links

 

Explosions in 1958
1958 in the United States
Argus
Exoatmospheric nuclear weapons testing
Lockheed Corporation
Argus
United States government secrecy
Military history of the Atlantic Ocean
1958 in military history
August 1958 events in the United States
September 1958 events in the United States
Rockets and missiles